Denise Ramsden may refer to:

 Denise Ramsden (cyclist) (born 1990), Canadian road bicycle racer
 Denise Ramsden (athlete) (1952–2003), English sprint athlete